Antoliano Santiago Moyano (born 23 September 1997) is an Argentine professional footballer who plays as a midfielder for Villa Dálmine, on loan from Talleres.

Career
Moyano made his bow in senior football aged fifteen with Juventud Sportiva Totoral in Liga Colón, a competition he also featured for Deportivo Colón in. 2014 saw Moyano move to Talleres, initially featuring for their academy before being an unused substitute on one occasion in both the 2016–17 and 2017–18 seasons in the Primera División. On 26 June 2018, Moyano was loaned to Primera B Nacional's Instituto. He made his professional bow during a 3–0 loss to Villa Dálmine in August.

Career statistics
.

References

External links

1997 births
Living people
Sportspeople from Córdoba Province, Argentina
Argentine footballers
Association football midfielders
Primera Nacional players
Talleres de Córdoba footballers
Instituto footballers
Villa Dálmine footballers